Ronald Joseph Karkovice (born August 8, 1963) is an American former professional baseball catcher.

Drafted by the Chicago White Sox in the 1st round of the 1982 MLB amateur draft, Karkovice would make his Major League Baseball debut with the Chicago White Sox on August 17, 1986, and appeared in his final game on September 26, 1997. He was called "Officer Ron Karkovice" by White Sox broadcaster Ken "Hawk" Harrelson due to Karkovice's great defensive prowess in throwing out baserunner attempting to steal bases.

Early life
When Karkovice was seven years old, his family moved to Florida after his father, who worked for United Airlines, was transferred. He began playing baseball in Little League at age eight. Karkovice later attended Boone High School in Orlando, where he first started catching at 14, and was teammates with Joe Oliver. He was named to the 1982 ABCA/Rawlings High School All-America First Team. Karkovice was inducted into Boone's hall of fame in 2004.

Playing career
Karkovice was one of the best fielding catchers in the Major Leagues during his time with the White Sox.  For his career, he threw out 41% of base stealers.  In 1993, he threw out 54% of them.

On August 30, 1990, Karkovice hit an inside-the-park grand slam off of Minnesota Twins pitcher David West at the Hubert H. Humphrey Metrodome.

Coaching career
In 2001 Karkovice managed the Gulf Coast League Royals. He then coached the First Academy baseball team in Orlando in an assistant capacity, before moving on as head coach for Pine Castle Christian Academy. From 2009 to 2011, Karkovice served as hitting coach for the Newark Bears of the Atlantic League of Professional Baseball. In 2012, Karkovice was named bench coach for the Camden Riversharks, another Atlantic League team. He was promoted to manager of the club the next year.

Personal life
He is married to Kimberly Fuller Karkovice.

In the 1990s, Karkovice was an early investor in Stix Baseball, a baseball bat manufacturer which was eventually bought by Easton.

Karkovice opened Ronnie's Big League Deli in Orlando in November 2003.

Professional baseball pitcher Jake Brigham is Karkovice's nephew.

See also
List of Major League Baseball players who spent their entire career with one franchise

References

External links

1963 births
Living people
American expatriate baseball players in Canada
Appleton Foxes players
Baseball coaches from New Jersey
Baseball players from New Jersey
Birmingham Barons players
Chicago White Sox players
Denver Zephyrs players
Glens Falls White Sox players
Gulf Coast White Sox players
Hawaii Islanders players
Major League Baseball catchers
People from Union Township, Union County, New Jersey
Sportspeople from the New York metropolitan area
Vancouver Canadians players
William R. Boone High School alumni